The 1989–90 season was the 93rd season of competitive football in Scotland.

Notable events
Rangers won their third league title in four seasons under the management of Graeme Souness.

Aberdeen won their first major honours since the departure of Alex Ferguson, winning a cup double of the Scottish Cup and the League Cup.

Celtic finished the season without winning a trophy, mounting the pressure on manager Billy McNeill.

Rangers abandoned their longstanding signing policy by acquiring Mo Johnston, who was the first high-profile Catholic player to sign for Rangers. Johnston joined Rangers after having come close to rejoining his old club Celtic from French club Nantes. Also arriving at Rangers was the Everton and England winger Trevor Steven, filling the gap on the right wing left by club hero David Cooper, who signed for Motherwell.

Rangers had four players – more than any other club – selected for the England World Cup squad. Goalkeeper Chris Woods, defenders Gary Stevens and Terry Butcher, and winger Trevor Steven helped them reach the semi-finals.

Scottish Premier Division

Champions: Rangers
Relegated: Dundee

Scottish League Division One

Promoted: St Johnstone
Relegated: Albion Rovers, Alloa Athletic

Scottish League Division Two

Promoted: Brechin City, Kilmarnock

Other honours

Cup honours

Senior

Individual honours

SPFA awards

SFWA awards

Scotland national team

Key:
(H) = Home match
(A) = Away match
WCQG5 = World Cup qualifying – Group 5
WCGC = World Cup – Group C

See also
 1989–90 Aberdeen F.C. season
 1989–90 Dundee United F.C. season
 1989–90 Rangers F.C. season

Notes and references

 
Seasons in Scottish football